The Journal of Physics B: Atomic, Molecular and Optical Physics is a biweekly peer-reviewed scientific journal published by IOP Publishing. It was established in 1968 from the division of the earlier title, Proceedings of the Physical Society. In 2006, the Journal of Optics B: Quantum and Semiclassical Optics was merged with the Journal of Physics B. The editor-in-chief is Marc Vrakking (Max Born Institute for Nonlinear Optics and Short Pulse Spectroscopy).

Scope
The journal covers research on atomic, molecular, and optical physics. Topics include  atomic and molecular structure, spectra and collisions, ultracold matter, quantum optics and non linear optics, quantum information, laser physics, intense laser fields, ultrafast and x-ray physics and atomic and molecular physics in plasmas. 

The journal publishes research papers, fast track communications, topical reviews, tutorials, and invited articles. It occasionally publishes special issues on developing research fields.

Abstracting and indexing
The journal is abstracted and indexed in:

See also
 Journal of Physics

References

External links

Journal of Optics B: Quantum and Semiclassical Optics website

IOP Publishing academic journals
Physics journals
Publications established in 1968
Biweekly journals
English-language journals
Hybrid open access journals